Ketorfanol (INN, USAN) (developmental code name SBW-22), or ketorphanol, is an opioid analgesic of the morphinan family that was found to possess "potent antiwrithing activity" in animal assays but was never marketed. It is a 17-cycloalkylmethyl derivative of morphinan and as such, is closely related structurally to butorphanol, cyclorphan, oxilorphan, proxorphan, and xorphanol, which act preferentially as κ-opioid receptor agonists and to a lesser extent as μ-opioid receptor partial agonists/antagonists.

See also 
 Butorphanol
 Levallorphan
 Levomethorphan
 Levorphanol
 Nalbuphine
 Xorphanol

References 

Phenols
Analgesics
Ketones
Morphinans
Opioids